is a fictional character in the Final Fantasy series, and the main antagonist of Final Fantasy VII developed by Square (now Square Enix). He is later revealed to be the result of an experiment by the megacorporation Shinra, in which they injected him with cells from the extraterrestrial lifeform Jenova when he was still a fetus. Upon discovering this, Sephiroth becomes consumed by his rage and decides to take control of the Planet, while Cloud and the game's other protagonists attempt to stop him. Sephiroth's background and role in the story are expanded in the Compilation of Final Fantasy VII. Additionally, he appears as a guest character in other video games and media, such as a recurring boss in the Kingdom Hearts series and as a playable character in Super Smash Bros. Ultimate.

Character designer Tetsuya Nomura conceived and designed Sephiroth as an antagonist to—and direct physical opposite of—the game's main character, Cloud Strife. The character was voiced by voice actor Toshiyuki Morikawa in Japanese. In English, Sephiroth has been voiced by Lance Bass in Kingdom Hearts (2002), and by George Newbern in both Kingdom Hearts II (2005) and the Compilation of Final Fantasy VII metaseries (2004-present). For the Final Fantasy VII Remake project, Newbern was succeeded in the role by Tyler Hoechlin. Hoechlin also reprises the role in the remastered Crisis Core: Final Fantasy VII Reunion (2022), replacing Newbern's English performance in the original game.

Sephiroth has been well-received within the video game community and is highly ranked on many lists of the best video game villains and Final Fantasy characters based on his role in the narrative and his high challenge level. He was also the subject of analysis as a Final Fantasy villain who lost his humanity upon learning of his alien heritage and how he constantly attempts to corrupt Cloud not only through his mayhem but also by highlighting his mental weakness.

Concept and creation

Sephiroth was designed by Final Fantasy VIIs character designer Tetsuya Nomura. His name came from the Kabbalah, in which the ten sephirot on the Tree of life represent the ten attributes through which God  reveals himself. His character existed from the earliest stages of development, as originally, Nomura thought that the game's plot would deal exclusively with Cloud Strife pursuing Sephiroth, who was always the game's main antagonist. Nomura wanted Sephiroth to appear early in the game, and then have the plot dealing with the protagonists following him, so that gamers would not meet the final boss until extremely late in the game. Sephiroth was initially going to be Aerith Gainsborough's sibling, as indicated by their similar hairstyles. Later, however, he was changed to Aerith's past love, whom she would remember upon meeting Cloud. This character was then changed to Zack Fair and Sephiroth's prior relationship with Aerith was dropped. In early drafts of the game, Sephiroth's personality was already brutal and cruel, with a strong willed and calm ego. He was to suffer from Mako addiction, resulting in a semi-conscious state as a result of high level exposure to Mako energy. Sephiroth was also intended to manipulate Cloud into believing that he was a creation of Sephiroth's will, but this aspect of the story was later abandoned. In another excised scene, when Sephiroth's physical body is first seen in the Northern Crater, it was to be female. Yoshitaka Amano, who had handled character illustrations for previous Final Fantasy titles,  noted a contrast between Cloud, a "young, passionate boy", and Sephiroth, a "more mature and cool" individual, as "intriguing", though not unusual as a pairing. Jason Greenberg, the only artist working on the original PC port, recalled a crash bug that happened during Sephiroth's  technique. Near the end of the development cycle, many team members were done with their work and simply helped test the game as much as possible. Greenberg spent nearly 24 hours playing that one battle during development.

Sephiroth has long platinum hair and bright cyan eyes with catlike pupils, and is depicted in a black coat decorated with metallic pauldrons. Since appearing as Safer Sephiroth in the final battle of the game, Sephiroth has had a single black wing on his back, referencing his theme music "One Winged Angel". When Crisis Core: Final Fantasy VII was released, the staff claimed that the reason the wing was black was to suggest evil. Nomura has stated that Sephiroth was made to be a complete contrast to the game's main protagonist, Cloud, who was originally designed to have slicked-back, black hair with no spikes. His weapon, the "Masamune", which has been featured in numerous Final Fantasy titles, is an elongated nodachi that he learned to use during his days in SOLDIER. The Masamune is named after the famous Japanese swordsmith Goro Nyudo Masamune, whose blades are considered national treasures in Japan today. When designing Cloud and Sephiroth, Nomura was influenced by his view of their rivalry mirroring the legendary animosity between Miyamoto Musashi and Sasaki Kojirō, with Cloud and Sephiroth being Musashi and Kojirō respectively. Sephiroth's look was defined as "kakkoii", a Japanese term combining good looks with coolness.

Director Yoshinori Kitase believes Sephiroth's role in Final Fantasy VII to be one of the main reasons why the game became so popular. Nomura has called Sephiroth "the ultimate antagonist in the Final Fantasy VII saga, there can't be anyone else", and regards him as an enemy from a previous generation, in contrast to his "Remnants" who appear in Final Fantasy VII: Advent Children.

For Advent Children, the film sequel to Final Fantasy VII, scriptwriter Kazushige Nojima thought that the film's plot would be less entertaining without Sephiroth. His revival in the film was introduced in the early stages of development, but the official decision as to how to bring him back was not reached until later. Nomura originally planned to have him appear from the start, but as it took the staff two years to develop his design, the idea of his presence throughout the film was scrapped, and it was decided instead to have him only appear on the screen for a short time. Sephiroth was designed for the film in such a way so as to emphasize his other-worldliness, such as the fact that he never blinks or is seen breathing, and his voice remains always monotone and calm. In the film, the staff stated that his strength had considerably increased, to the point that he had "ascended to a new level of existence".

Despite initially encountering problems as to who would voice him, Nomura said that once Toshiyuki Morikawa auditioned for the role, they knew they had their actor. Morikawa was instructed by the staff to speak all of Sephiroth's dialogue as if he felt superior to every other character in the film. The voice director and Morikawa agreed to make Sephiroth's voice sound calm to the point that he believes he cannot lose to Cloud, suggesting to Morikawa that he may reappear at some point in the future. In the prequel Crisis Core, Morikawa portrayed Sephiroth in a charismatic fashion as in early events Sephiroth is presented as a hero.

For the remake of Final Fantasy VII, Yoshinori Kitase wanted Sephiroth to have more scenes than in the original game due to his popularity while comparing him with the build of the film Jaws. In the climax of the remake, Cloud encounters his nemesis, Sephiroth, once again. Sephiroth's words following the fight were kept as ambiguous.

Musical themes

In Final Fantasy VII, Sephiroth is the focus of two pieces of music written by series composer Nobuo Uematsu.

In the final battle,  plays while the player combats Sephiroth's first form, "Bizarro Sephiroth" (also known as "Reverse Sephiroth").

It contains Latin lyrics taken from sections of the Carmina Burana. In an interview featured on G4's Game Makers (formerly Icons), Uematsu revealed that this piece was designed to be a fusion of the musical styles of Russian composer Igor Stravinsky and rock musician Jimi Hendrix. The song revolves around his character, as this was what Uematsu was thinking about when writing it. Two official covers have been done of this song. The first is a different orchestration found in Kingdom Hearts, arranged by series' composer Yoko Shimomura, the second is found in Advent Children, which plays throughout the battle between Cloud and Sephiroth, and features the progressive metal stylings of Nobuo Uematsu's former band The Black Mages, as well as orchestral elements and new lyrics. There is also a fourth version titled "Vengeance on the World" that plays in Crisis Core.

Appearances

In Final Fantasy VII

Sephiroth is the main antagonist in Final Fantasy VII, who first appears after assassinating President Shinra. As revealed over the course of the game, Sephiroth was once the most powerful member of SOLDIER, Shinra's elite military division, who was celebrated as a heroic Invincible veteran of the Shinra-Wutai war. After the war, however, Sephiroth was sent on a mission to the village of Nibelheim, where he discovered that he was the product of a biological experiment that combined a human fetus with tissue from the extraterrestrial lifeform Jenova. Upon discovering the truth of his origins and the experiments that created him, Sephiroth develops an intense hatred for Shinra, which develops into hatred for all life. Learning that Jenova, who he comes to consider his "mother", attempted to take control of the Planet 2000 years previously, Sephiroth decides to follow in her footsteps and become a god who would rule over the Planet. He burns down the entire village and kills many, but is assumed dead after a confrontation with Cloud inside a nearby Mako reactor, although Cloud does not believe it was he who had killed Sephiroth, whose skill and might dwarfs his, and acknowledges Sephiroth most probably had won but spared him for unknown reasons. However, a few years later, Sephiroth appears once again, determined to continue with his mission.

His plan to become a god is based upon his belief that he can merge with the Planet's Lifestream, taking control of it, and thus the Planet itself. In order to do so, he must summon Meteor, a destructive meteorite entity from outer space that can catastrophically damage the Planet. At this point, the Lifestream will flow to attempt to heal the injury, thus allowing Sephiroth to merge with it. Despite appearing multiple times throughout the game, it is revealed that Sephiroth's physical body is actually sealed in the Northern Crater, and that the manifestations seen by Cloud and his allies were parts of Jenova's body taking on his appearance, controlled by the wounded Sephiroth in the Planet core. In the game's last battle, Sephiroth takes two final forms: The first one is called Bizarro Sephiroth. This form is named "Libath Sephiroth" in the original Japanese version (リバース・セフィロス, Ribāsu Sefirosu), which means "The Core of Sephiroth" or "Sephiroth's Core" in Hebrew (ליבת ספירות). The last one is called Safer Sephiroth. This form is named "Seifa Sephiroth" in the original Japanese version (セーファ・セフィロス, Sēfa Sefirosu), which means "Final Sephiroth" or "The Last Part of Sephiroth" in Hebrew (סיפא ספירות). After his defeat, Sephiroth reappears in Cloud's mind, but is once again defeated. The Meteor still hits the planet but only the city of Midgar is destroyed as Aerith's magic executed before her death manages to reduce the damage.

In Compilation of Final Fantasy VII
He makes several cameo appearances in the Final Fantasy VII prequel, Before Crisis, in which he supports Shinra in their battle against the eco-terrorist organization AVALANCHE. The incident at Nibelheim is also featured in the game. The OVA Last Order also depicts the Nibelheim incident. Sephiroth also appears in Advent Children, a CGI film set two years after Final Fantasy VII. In the film, Kadaj, Loz, and Yazoo, the "Remnants" of Sephiroth, try to reincarnate him. Although Kadaj eventually succeeds, Cloud once again defeats Sephiroth, whose body changes back to Kadaj's upon his defeat. Sephiroth is also the focus of the On the Way to a Smile novella "Case of the Lifestream — Black and White". Set after the end of Final Fantasy VII but prior to the events of Advent Children, the story deals with Aerith and Sephiroth's journeys through the Lifestream, and Sephiroth's creation of Geostigma, a disease that infects anyone who came into contact with the tainted Lifestream. He makes a very brief appearance in Dirge of Cerberus, a game set one year after Advent Children, in which his biological mother, Lucrecia Crescent discusses the experiments which gave birth to him.

He is one of the main characters in the Final Fantasy VII prequel game Crisis Core, in which he and the protagonist Zack Fair go in the search of two missing SOLDIERs, Genesis Rhapsodos and Angeal Hewley, This game also depicts the Nibelheim incident, where Sephiroth appears as a boss. Executive producer Yoshinori Kitase was pleased with Sephiroth's role in Crisis Core, feeling that he was given a more human side.

Other appearances
His first appearance outside Final Fantasy VII was as a selectable character in the fighting game Ehrgeiz. A redesigned Sephiroth also appears in the North American and European versions of Kingdom Hearts as an optional boss character in Olympus Coliseum. Lance Bass voiced Sephiroth in this game, while in subsequent titles he was replaced by George Newbern. In the Japanese re-release of the game, Final Mix, an additional scene was added in which Sephiroth fights Cloud, although the result of the fight is not revealed. Sephiroth was not included in the sequel Kingdom Hearts: Chain of Memories, as director Tetsuya Nomura could not give him a storyline related to Cloud, and feared negative fan response if Sephiroth did not have a notable role in the story. His third appearance outside Final Fantasy VII is as another optional boss in Kingdom Hearts II, where he is first encountered by the series' protagonist, Sora, and then Cloud, who is pursuing him. When Sephiroth battles Cloud, both of them disappear, with Sora believing that they went somewhere else to continue their fight. Nomura said that in this game, Sephiroth represents Cloud's dark side, in contrast to Tifa Lockhart, who represents his light side. Although Sephiroth does not appear in the prequel Kingdom Hearts Birth by Sleep, he is mentioned as a hero that Zack Fair aspires to be. The staff, however, did not know if they would portray him as a being of darkness as shown in other titles. Sephiroth's fourth outside appearance is in the Itadaki Street games Special and Portable, where he appears as an unlockable playable character. Due to Sephiroth's many appearances as a boss in the Kingdom Hearts series, Square Enix decided he would not return in Kingdom Hearts III as it would be redundant.

Sephiroth was also the representative villain of Final Fantasy VII in Dissidia Final Fantasy. He is featured in his FFVII guise, while an alternative outfit features the "Safer Sephiroth" form. His fight against Cloud in the game was based on their fights from Final Fantasy VII and Advent Children. Along with the rest of the VII figures in Dissidia, Sephiroth appears in the prequel Dissidia 012. This game also includes a slightly altered Final Fantasy VII form for Sephiroth, as well as his Kingdom Hearts form. Sephiroth returns as a playable character opposite Cloud in the third entry, Dissidia NT. His form from Final Fantasy VII Remake also appeared in Final Fantasy Brave Exvius. He is featured in the rhythm game Theatrhythm Final Fantasy and its sequel, Curtain Call, as an unlockable character, representing Final Fantasy VII. He appears in the puzzle-platform game LittleBigPlanet, and its sequel as a character model; Media Molecule's Alex Evans felt "honored" that Sephiroth was allowed to appear in the games. He also appeared as a cameo in Monster Hunter 4 Ultimate as a weapon, which was designed as a single black wing and referencing Sephiroth's appearance during the last battle of Final Fantasy VII. Sephiroth appeared as playable fighter in Super Smash Bros. Ultimate. Despite officially released in December 22, 2020, he was made available five days prior for a limited time via an event in which the player must defeat him in a Final Fantasy-themed stamina match.

Cultural impact

Merchandise
Sephiroth has served as a basis for several types of merchandise. These include the "Extra Knights" action figures first published by Bandai in Japan in 1997. A different model was released as part of the Play Arts collection, following the release of Advent Children. At the 2008 San Diego Comic-Con International, Kanji Tashiro, Square Enix's manager of merchandise, said that this figure was one of their best-selling items. With the release of the film, Sephiroth was also included in a series of promotional material, primarily consisting of posters. Kotobukiya has included the character in numerous merchandise, including a series of cold casts based on his appearance in both the original game and the film sequel. As a result of promotional campaigns organized in Japan by Square Enix and Coca-Cola, a version of Sephiroth drawn in a super deformed style was featured in the first two volumes of a promotional collection.

Products not connected to the release of the games or films have also been produced. These include a figure as part of the Final Fantasy Trading Arts Vol. 1 series, a set as part of the Square Minimum Collection alongside Cloud, and a rare figure of "Safer Sephiroth" as part of the Final Fantasy Creatures series (Chromium). "Reverse Sephiroth" was also released as a normal figure in volume 2. A figure based on his appearances in the Kingdom Hearts games was released in the second series of the Play Arts Kingdom Hearts sub-line. Some replica weapon companies have produced replicas of Sephiroth's sword, the Masamune, as a  katana with a stainless steel unsharpened blade. A statue at Kyoto University depicting Sephiroth was also made. Sephiroth received an amiibo figurine for use in Super Smash Bros. Ultimate, which was released in January 2022.

Reception

Popularity
On multiple occasions, numerous gaming magazines have chosen Sephiroth as one of the best villains from both the Final Fantasy series in specific and in all of video games in general. GameSpy placed him eighth in their 2014 list of top villains in games, commenting on how difficult it is to defeat him in Final Fantasy VII. He has been named the number one villain in an episode of G4's Filter. PC World placed him second in their 2008 list of most diabolical video game villains of all time. Dave Smith called him the "heavyweight champion of Final Fantasy villains", and praised his appearance and backstory. He would take the same spot in the list of top 25 Final Fantasy characters by the same site. In IGNs Final Fantasy reader's choice, also written by Smith, Sephiroth was placed fourth, with commentary focusing on his activities in the game's plot. In a retrospective on Final Fantasy antagonists, GamesRadar listed Sephiroth as their top pick, citing his developed motives and acts of evil. The official blog of Middle East Games Con and GamesRadar both also put Sephiroth in their list of the best villains in video game history. Sephiroth is ranked 19th place in IGNs list of Top 100 Villains from film, television, video games, and comics.

In 2007, Sephiroth was named the 14th best character of all time in Dengeki PlayStations retrospective awards feature about the original PlayStation. UGO placed Sephiroth 25th on their 2009 list of top Japanese RPG characters, calling him "one of the most visually striking villains of all time" while praising how different he is from previous Final Fantasy villains. Famitsu readers voted Sephiroth as the 21st most popular video game character. In the Guinness World Records Gamer's Edition from 2011, he was voted as the 32nd best video game character of all time, and sixth in their list of "top 50 video game villains". "Kenny Omega" sported a Sephiroth style attire and did an One-Winged-Angel entrance at "Wrestle Kingdom 17". Omega sported the attire and nickname in the video game Like a Dragon: Ishin.

Critical response
A reader's choice poll organized by GameSpot placed Sephiroth as the best boss of all time, receiving five times more votes than Bowser, who finished in second place; most of the comments noted the difficulty of the final fight against Sephiroth, as well as its distinctive elements when compared to other games. Electronic Gaming Monthly listed him as number one in their list of top video game bosses. Game Informer ranked the "top-notch" fight against Sephiroth in Final Fantasy VII at third place on their 2008 list of top boss battles. PlayStation Official Magazine praised his rivalry with Cloud. AnimeFringe called him "the most notorious villain in the entire Final Fantasy series" and "quintessential bishōnen in the eyes of many fans -- male and female", comparing him with Kefka and praising his complexity.

The scene in which Sephiroth kills Aerith during Final Fantasy VII has also prompted much commentary. GamesRadar called him "the biggest cock blocker in the gaming world", as writer Shane Patterson found Aerith's character to be appealing, and due to the fact Sephiroth killed her, players were unable to use her anymore. Also referring to the scene as a shocking moment, GameSpot suggested that the FMV sequence of Sephiroth appearing in front of the Nibelheim fire "might be one of the most recognizable cutscenes ever to grace video games".

However, some game editors have criticized Sephiroth's character. For example, IGNs Smith has stated that "Sephiroth was certainly a good-looking fellow, but his motivations were about as clear as mud". When comparing Sephiroth with the Final Fantasy VI villain, Kefka Palazzo, GamesRadar commented that he "seems as interesting as a dead accountant painted brown", while Screen Rant said that "Sephiroth is an iconic character, but not the most interesting villain to emerge from the Final Fantasy franchise". GameSpy editor Ryan Scott called Sephiroth the "King of Overrated Characters" during its villain feature for Dissidia Final Fantasy, arguing that gamers were impressed by him only because of his design and by how he killed Aerith during Final Fantasy VII. 

Critics have also commented on Sephiroth's role in works. Destructoid noted there was a message within the writing of the film regarding the characters' lives in Midgar since the story ended with Cloud saving Midgar from Sephiroth's resurrection which would threaten it again especially when the spirit of Zack Fair reminds him that he has already defeated him. Kotaku saw the focus on the Midgar's ruins as a parallelism with psychological trauma due to how all of its survivors suffer a disease that cannot be fought with Cloud's striking weaponry on its own in contrast to his fights with the villain. Yoshinori Kitase stated that the fight between Cloud and Sephiroth was popular enough to make Japanese gamers do a remake of it for the crossover Dissidia Final Fantasy and expected Western fans also emulate it. In relation to Crisis Core, IGN AU said that "even Sephiroth gets his moments in the sun", praising the depth in his backstory, which would later make his boss battle more entertaining. IGN UK agreed, stating that his character was granted "a more human dimension" and enjoying some of the events from before his transformation into a villain. Though Meristation found Sephiroth more friendly in the prequel, his relationship with Genesis was panned for forcing his transformation into the emblematic villain he was known for in the original game rather than always acting on his own free will. His boss battle was also shown in 1UPs "25 More of the Most Badass Boss Fights Ever" in which the staff praised how the original battle from Final Fantasy VII was expanded in the title. The idea that there are four characters with Sephiroth's name led VG247 to note the remake still had its own mysteries that original players would not understand while the title. Siliconera described this incarnation of the antagonist as haunting, due to how he often appears within Cloud's hallucinations across the plot. Electronic Gaming Monthly felt the remake's Sephiroth was more menacing than in the original due to his constant threats towards Cloud.

Several writers also noted Sephiroth's overpowered nature as a Kingdom Hearts boss, noting that regardless of the player's skill "walking away from this match unscathed" is not possible, to the point of saying that the fight was more difficult than the entirety of Final Fantasy VII. AnimeFringe stated that only advanced gamers would be able to defeat Kingdom Heartss Sephiroth because the player has no backup and that his "devastating attacks can kill in seconds". In 2013, Complex ranked Sephiroth in Kingdom Hearts and Kingdom Hearts II as respectively the seventh and fifth hardest boss fights in video games; in addition, Safer Sephiroth from Final Fantasy VII placed 12th. Masahiro Sakurai agreed that there are too many sword fighters after the addition of Sephiroth to Super Smash Bros. Ultimate. He said: "Well, even if it is another sword fighter, it will be fine as long as we balance them properly", implying that no one should blame him for the inclusion of sword-wielding fighters. Chris Carter of Destructoid and Ethan Gach of Kotaku both praised the addition of Sephiroth.

Analysis

In Reverse Design: Final Fantasy VII, Sephiroth was noted that his desire for world domination make him come across as simpleminded, but the lack of humanity in his background serves as the cause for such cause of characterization. Though Sephiroth might come across as lost in his own insanity, during Cloud's flashback when remembering him, the game's villain misses a late Shinra researcher in regards to his origins. In the book The World of Final Fantasy VII: Essays on the Game and Its Legacy, Sephiroth's realization of his connection with Jenova and his transformation into the game's villain, makes him lose his entire humanity. He threatens world peace with his mayhem and becomes comparable to Satan. Like Satan, Sephiroth claims he will never die, most notably in Advent Children upon being defeated by Cloud which causes him to say "I will never be a memory". The way he was born as a test subject by Gojo was created to the Frankenstein's monster from Mary Shelley's 1818 novel. Destructoid noted there was a message within the writing of the film regarding the characters' lives in Midgar, leading them to move on with their lives in a similar fashion to Final Fantasy VII gamers since the story ended with Cloud saving Midgar from Sephiroth's resurrection which would threaten it again especially when the spirit of Zack Fair reminds him that he has already defeated him already.

Although Sephiroth is not based on any mythical figurine, in The Secret Mythology of Final Fantasy Sephiroth's final boss form was instead compared more to 777 and Other Qabalistic Writings of Aleister Crowley written by Aleister Crowley which also explores Hermetic Qabalah like Sephiroth's name implies. PCGamer saw Sephiroth as Cloud's shadow the hero has to surpass as his mental issues and vulnerability are often shown whenever the villain is exposed in his past. Kotaku agreed about Sephiroth's portrayal as a shadow Cloud has to surpass again in the film as he attempts to traumatize him again similar to his Kingdom Hearts characterization.

See also
 List of Final Fantasy VII characters

References

External links

 Sephiroth on the Final Fantasy Wiki

Characters designed by Tetsuya Nomura
Extraterrestrial–human hybrids in video games
Fictional hypnotists and indoctrinators
Fictional mass murderers
Fictional private military members
Fictional rampage and spree killers
Fictional samurai
Fictional soldiers in video games
Fictional super soldiers
Fictional swordfighters in video games
Final Fantasy VII characters
Genetically engineered characters in video games
Internet memes
Male video game villains
Science fantasy video game characters
Shapeshifter characters in video games
Super Smash Bros. fighters
Video game bosses
Video game characters introduced in 1997
Video game characters who can move at superhuman speeds
Video game characters who use magic
Video game characters with superhuman strength